Bylong River, a perennial river of the Hunter River catchment, is located in the Central Tablelands and Upper Hunter regions of New South Wales, Australia.

Course
Bylong River rises in the central tablelands of the Capertee Valley, within Wollemi National Park, on the north-western slopes of the Great Dividing Range, below Goat Mountain, and flows generally north-east, joined by seven tributaries, including the Growee River, before reaching its confluence with the Goulburn River, north of the village of Bylong. The river descends  over its  course.

The Goulburn River eventually flows into the Hunter River, a major waterway which flows into the Tasman Sea at Newcastle.

See also

 List of rivers of Australia
 List of rivers of New South Wales (A–K)
 Rivers of New South Wales

References

External links
 

 

Rivers of New South Wales
Rivers of the Hunter Region